Judith Chapman (born Judith Shepard on November 15, 1951) is an American actress, best known for soap opera roles, particularly as Natalie Bannon Hughes in As the World Turns (1975–1978), Charlotte Greer on Ryan's Hope (1983), Ginny Blake Webber on General Hospital (1984–1986), Sandra Montaigne on One Life to Live (1987), Anjelica Deveraux on Days of Our Lives (1989–1991, 2018), and Gloria Abbott Bardwell on The Young and the Restless (2005–2018, 2020–).

Life and career
Chapman was born in Greenville, South Carolina. She is the daughter of retired United States Air Force brigadier general Leland C. Shepard Jr. Her older sister Patty Shepard (born 1945) also worked as an actress. She debuted at the age of 16 in the Spaghetti Western Up the MacGregors! (1967). After getting a degree in theater from Stephens College, she headed to New York, where she joined the Actors Studio and began working in commercials and theater. In 1977, she made her American big screen debut in the psychological horror film False Face.

Chapman has appeared on several daytime dramas since the mid-1970s. Her first soap role was scheming Natalie Bannon (one of Tom Hughes' wives) on CBS soap As the World Turns from 1975-1978. She guest-starred on prime time series include Kojak , Fantasy Island, Barnaby Jones, The Incredible Hulk, Galactica 1980, The Love Boat, and two times on Magnum, P.I.. She had a recurring roles on Flamingo Road and The Fall Guy. In 1977, she tested for the role of Pam Ewing on CBS primetime soap opera, Dallas.

A four-month stint as the mysterious Charlotte Greer on Ryan's Hope in 1983 brought Chapman critical acclaim. Her role had her character as part of a revenge plot against the Ryan family after lying to the press that she was Frank Ryan's ex-wife. She joined the cast of General Hospital the following year as the devious Ginny Blake who was the biological mother of Mike Webber, adopted by Rick and Lesley. After Lesley's "death", Rick and Ginny married in an attempt to share custody and fell in love after Ginny was found to be the killer of D.L. Brock. She received Soap Opera Digest Award for Outstanding Lead Actress in a Daytime Drama nomination for her performance. After that stint ended, she had a brief role on One Life to Live as Sandra Montaigne, a con-artist out to scam ex-boyfriend Jonathan Russell. She was the third former General Hospital actress to play the role of Anjelica Devereaux Curtis on Days of Our Lives, playing that part from 1989-1990 and briefly in 1991.

Chapman had supporting roles in films And God Created Woman (1988), Dead Space (1991), Fire on the Amazon (1993), Night of the Running Man (1995), 28 Days (2000), and The Sweetest Thing (2002). She appeared in three episodes of Murder, She Wrote, and five times on Silk Stalkings as different characters. She starred in the LGBT comedy film Saugatuck Cures (2015), and in 2021 played Nancy Reagan in the biographical drama King Richard.

Chapman made her first appearance on The Young and the Restless after that, briefly subbing for Jess Walton as Jill Abbott. She joined the cast of The Young and the Restless full-time in January 2005, replacing Joan Van Ark in the contract role of Gloria Fisher. In March 2011, it was announced that Chapman had been taken off her contract and bumped to recurring. In October 2014, it was announced that she would make a guest appearance as Gloria on The Bold and the Beautiful. She appeared in a few more episodes of The Young and the Restless in 2015 and 2016. She played Diana Cooper on Days of Our Lives for two months in 2019, then returned to Y&R.

Filmography

Film

Television

 As the World Turns (1975–1978) as Natalie Bannon Hughes
 Kojak (1976) as Gretchen Hodges 
 Barnaby Jones (1978) as Rita Lockwood
 Fantasy Island (1978) as Evelyn Wallace 
 The Paper Chase (1979) as Amelia Hutton 
 B. J. and the Bear (1980) as Pamela Gerard 
 Beyond Westworld (1980) as Laura Garvey (Pilot episode only)
 Buck Rogers in the 25th Century (1980) as Lara Teasian 
 Galactica 1980 (1980) as Angela 
 Family (1980) as Jo Hamlin
 The Incredible Hulk (1980) as Nancy 
 Fitz and Bones (1981) as Clementine 
 Magnum, P.I. (1981) as Lisa Page/Sara Clifford / Louise DeBolt Jackson (2 episodes)
 The Love Boat (1981) as Nancy Atwell 
 The Fall Guy (1981–1983) as Kay Faulkner (4 episodes)
 Darkroom (1982) as Pamela 
 Knight Rider (1982) as Linda Elliot 
 Return of the Man from U.N.C.L.E. (1983) as Technical Agent Z
 Ryan's Hope (1983) as Charlotte 
 Simon & Simon (1983) as Denise Carroll 
 Trapper John, M.D. (1983) as Robin Yaeger 
 General Hospital (1984–1986) as Ginny Blake Webber 
 One Life to Live (1987) as Sandra Montaigne 
 Highway To Heaven (1987) as Gail
 Stingray (1987) as Carla 
 Murder, She Wrote (1987–1992) (3 episodes)
 MacGyver (1988) as Dr. Sandra Millhouse 
 In the Heat of the Night (1989) as Charlotte Sinclair 
 The Accident (1991) as Miss Radovich
 Days of Our Lives as Anjelica Deveraux (1989–1991, 2018) and Diana Colville (2019)
 Silk Stalkings (1996) as Marcia Travers
 The Young and the Restless (2005–2018, 2020–) as Gloria Abbott Bardwell 
 The Bold and the Beautiful (2014) as Gloria Abbott Bardwell

References

External links
 

Living people
20th-century American actresses
21st-century American actresses
Actresses from South Carolina
American film actresses
American soap opera actresses
American stage actresses
American television actresses
Spaghetti Western actresses
Actors from Greenville, South Carolina
1951 births